Christensen Nunatak is a nunatak  north of Robertson Island in the Seal Nunataks group, off the east coast of the Antarctic Peninsula. It was discovered in 1893 by a Norwegian expedition under C.A. Larsen, who named it for Christen Christensen of Sandefjord, Norway, a pioneer of modern Antarctic whaling. It was surveyed in 1902 by the Swedish Antarctic Expedition under Otto Nordenskiöld, and in 1947 and 1953 by the Falkland Islands Dependencies Survey.

References 

Nunataks of Graham Land
Oscar II Coast